Fuego Del Sol ("Fire of the Sun") (born October 16, 1995), is an American professional wrestler currently signed to All Elite Wrestling (AEW).

Professional wrestling career
Del Sol debuted in May 2014, largely competing on the independent circuit in Oklahoma and Texas. Del Sol participated in Impact Wrestling's Collision in Oklahoma on October 14, 2017, in a four-way match against Trevor Lee, DJZ and Malico. At Victory Road on September 14, 2019, Del Sol and Retro Randy were defeated by The North (Ethan Page and Josh Alexander). He also wrestled for WWE on January 6, 2020, as KJ Orso on Raw, losing to Erick Rowan.

Del Sol made regular appearances at AEW Dark and AEW Dark: Elevation throughout All Elite Wrestling's residency at Daily's Place during the COVID-19 pandemic. His first appearance was on June 9, when he teamed with Low Rida in a losing effort against SCU (Frankie Kazarian and Scorpio Sky). His run resulted in a 34 match losing streak, which was broken on July 6, 2021, where he teamed with Marko Stunt to defeat Ryzin and Baron Black.

On August 13, 2021, Del Sol made his Rampage debut in an AEW TNT Championship match, losing to Miro. Following the match Sammy Guevara offered him a contract and announced that he had joined the main roster. Del Sol would then purchase a new car which he would ultimately lose to Miro on September 17, in a Championship vs. Car match. On the September 29 episode of Dynamite Del Sol interfered in Guevara's match against Miro, resulting in Guevara winning the championship. On January 26, 2022, Del Sol once again aided Guevara in his TNT Championship match against Cody Rhodes at Beach Break. On March 16, Del Sol teamed with Bear Country in a loss to the House of Black on Dynamite. On March 30, he was again defeated by the House Of Black, teaming with Evil Uno and Stu Grayson on Rampage. On April 27, the House of Black appeared in the ring surrounding an already unconscious Del Sol, the group were attacked by Penta and the returning Ray Fénix.

Personal life
Del Sol resides in Oklahoma City. In April 2022, Del Sol underwent surgery due to a mouth infection.

Championships and accomplishments
Imperial Wrestling Revolution
IWR Revolutionary Championship (1 time)
Sabotage Wrestling
Sabotage Championship (1 time)

References

External links

1995 births
21st-century professional wrestlers
All Elite Wrestling personnel
American male professional wrestlers
Living people
Masked wrestlers
Professional wrestlers from Alabama